The Kermit Blosser Ohio Athletics Hall of Fame is the hall of fame for Ohio Bobcats athletes and athletic personnel. Since 1965, selectees to the Hall are inducted during annual ceremonies, including recognition at halftime of a home college football game. Inductees are also honored via display of their portrait and accomplishments in the Hall, located in the university's Convocation Center. Since 2000, the Hall usually names three to five new inductees each year.

Kermit Blosser

On October 20, 2006, Ohio athletic director Kirby Hocutt announced the renaming of the Ohio Athletics Hall of Fame to the Kermit Blosser Ohio Athletics Hall of Fame. Blosser, born in 1911, competed in football and wrestling at Ohio in the late 1920s and early 1930s. After serving in the military during World War II, he became an assistant coach at Ohio in 1946. He coached multiple sports for many years, ultimately retiring in 1988. Blosser was inducted to the NCAA Golf Coaches Hall of Fame in 1980 and the MAC Hall of Fame in 1988. He died in 2006, aged 95.

Members by induction year

1965–1969
1965
Frank Baumholtz, '41 (baseball, men's basketball)
Claude Chrisman, '32 (football)
Stanley Dougan, '14 (baseball)
Russ Finsterwald, '19 (football, men's basketball head coach, football head coach)
C. O. Gibson, '12 (baseball, men's basketball, football)
B. T. Grover, '19 (baseball, men's basketball, football)
Don Peden, '14 (baseball head coach, football head coach)
Dutch Trautwein, '38-'49 (men's basketball head coach, football assistant coach)

1966
Kermit Blosser, '32 (football, wrestling, men's basketball assistant coach, men's golf head coach, wrestling assistant coach)
M. Harold Brown, '33 (men's basketball, football)
Blaine Goldsberry, '14 (men's basketball)
Mark Hendrickson, '19 (baseball, men's basketball)
Krum Kahler, '08 (baseball)
Hokie Palmer, '16 (football)

1967
Herbert Bash, '17 (baseball, men's basketball, football)
John E. Brammer, '30 (baseball, men's basketball, football)
Eugene Rinta, '38 (men's basketball)
Jim Snyder, '41 (men's basketball, football, men's basketball head coach)
Frank Szalay, '42 (football)
Jerome Warshower, '31 (baseball, men's basketball, football)
Bob Wren, '43 (baseball, football, baseball head coach)

1968
Joseph W. Begala, '29 (football, wrestling)
Vince Costello, '53 (football)
John R. Goddard, '17 (baseball, football, men's track and field)
Angus E. King, '22 (baseball, men's basketball)
John W. Montgomery, '40 (baseball, football)
Dick Shrider, '48 (men's basketball)
Carroll C. Widdoes, '49-'69 (football head coach, tennis head coach, athletics director)

1969
Sim Earich, '28 (men's basketball, football)
Dow Finsterwald, '52 (men's golf)
Bill Hess, '47 (football, wrestling, football head coach)
Bill Jurkovic, '38 (baseball, football)
Art Lewis, '36 (football)
Pete McKinley, '29 (baseball, men's basketball, football)
Mark Wylie, '49 (baseball)

1970–1979
1970
Chet F. Adams, '39 (football, wrestling)
George M. Brown, '31 (baseball, football)
Carlisle Dollings, '25 (baseball, football)
Clark B. Gabriel, '32 (football)
John T. Malokas, '38 (baseball, men's basketball)
Carl H. Ott, '41 (men's basketball)

1971
Lester N. Carney, '59 (football, men's track and field)
Fletcher Gilders, '59-'84 (men's swimming and diving head coach)
William H. Herbert, '25 (football, men's track and field)
Len Janiak, '40 (football)
W.R. "Shorty" McReynolds, '15 (baseball, men's basketball, football)
Thor Olson, '16-'51 (wrestling head coach)
Robert A. Snyder, '37 (football)

1972
Bunk Adams, '61 (men's basketball)
Harry Houska, '65 (wrestling, wrestling head coach)
Russell Kepler, '32 (football, men's track and field)
Dutch Littler, '24 (football)
Robert "Fizz" Miller, '42 (men's basketball, football)
Jim Shreffler, '50 (baseball, men's basketball)
Milt Taylor, '50 (football)
Gus White, '21 (baseball)

1973
Elmore Banton, '65 (cross country, track and field/cross country head coach)
O.C. Bird, '22-'48 (athletics director)
Joseph W. Colvin, '33 (football)
Raymond C. Davis, '21 (men's basketball, football)
Howard E. Jolliff, '65 (men's basketball)
Dave Solomon, '70 (swimming and diving)
Woodrow "Woody" Wills, '37 (baseball, football)

1974
King Brady, '50 (baseball, football)
Francis "Peg" Fuller, '22 (baseball, men's basketball, football, men's track and field)
Hal Gruber, '37 (baseball)
Tom Nevits, '57 (wrestling)
Dan Risaliti, '41 (football, men's track and field)
Bill Rohr, '63-'78 (athletics director)

1975
Robert Brooks, '61 (football)
Cleve Bryant, '70 (football)
Joseph Dean, '61 (football, football assistant coach)
John Eastman, '66 (men's soccer)
Stan Huntsman, '57-'71 (men's track and field/cross country head coach)
Fred Schleicher, '47 (football, men's track and field, wrestling)

1976
Robert Bertelsen, '71 (men's cross country, men's track and field)
John Frick, '66 (football, football head coach)
Richard Murphy, '55 (baseball, men's basketball)
Larry Snyder, '60 (men's golf)
W. Neal Wade, '70 (swimming and diving)

1977
Jerry Jackson, '69 (men's basketball)
Bob Littler, '66 (men's golf)
Darnell Mitchell, '65 (men's cross country, men's track and field)
Mike Schmidt, '73 (baseball)
Todd Snyder, '72 (football)
Barry Sugden, '65 (men's cross country, men's track and field)
Bruce Trammell, '71 (wrestling)

1978
Tom Boyce, '61 (swimming and diving)
Terry Harmon, '67 (baseball)
Bob Harrison, '61 (football, men's track and field)
Don Hilt, '66 (men's basketball)
Don "Skip" Hoovler, '65 (football)
Lou Sawchik, '55 (men's basketball, football)

1979
Ken Carmon, '69 (football)
Terry Gray, '68 (men's hockey, men's hockey head coach)
Paul Halleck, '36 (football, men's track and field)
Lamar Jacobs, '59 (baseball)
Steve Rudo, '57 (wrestling)
Wendy Weeden (Devine), '74 (women's field hockey, women's lacrosse)

1980–1989
1980
John "Rosey" Kerns, '47 (football)
Anita Corl Miller, '73 (women's field hockey, women's lacrosse)
Charles Vandlik, '60 (men's golf)
P.J. Woodworth, '31 (team physician)

1981
Don Burnison, '36 (baseball, football)
Fred Picard, '54-'84 (faculty representative)
Larry Lee Thomas, '62 (baseball)
Chuck Woodlee, '62 (swimming and diving)
Edward "Zip" Zednik, '47 (football, wrestling)

1982
Richard "Rick" Dowswell, '74 (men's track and field)
Cliff Heffelfinger, '52-'78 (football assistant coach)
Bob "Hoss" Houmard, '71 (football)
Robert G. Kappes, '58 (football head coach)
Frank B. Richey, '47-'73 (football assistant coach)
Steven E. Swisher, '73 (baseball)
Donna Jean Taylor, '68 (women's field hockey, cross country, track and field)

1983
Andy Daniels, '78 (wrestling)
George R. "Pug" Hood, '38 (men's basketball)
David Juenger, '73 (football)
Tom Murphy, '67 (baseball)
Alfred Ogunfeyimi, '78 (men's track and field)

1984
John Fekete, '46 (football, men's track and field)
Bill Frederick, '56 (football)
Nick Lalich, '38 (men's basketball)
Ihor Miskewycz, '69 (men's soccer)
Henry "Tad" Potter, '57 (swimming and diving)

1985
Bruce Greene, '77 men's track and field
Al Hart, '58 (athletic trainer)
David Rambo, '53 (men's golf)
Barry Reighard, '73 (wrestling)
Ed Robbins, '70 (baseball)
Al Scheider, '52 (football)
Bill Schmidt, '40 (baseball, men's basketball, football)
Janet Schmitt (McDowell), '68 (women's field hockey, track and field, softball)

1986
Catherine Brown, '69 (women's field hockey/lacrosse/track and field head coach)
Roy Cheran, '76 (swimming and diving)
Dan Donofrio, '37 (football)
Walter Luckett, '75 (men's basketball)
Mike Murphy, '69 (baseball)

1987
Lynn Bozentka (Taylor), '79 (women's field hockey, women's tennis)
Bob Brenly, '77 (baseball)
Russ Johnson, '73 (wrestling)
Pete Lalich, '42 (baseball, men's basketball)
Eddie Roberts, '73 (men's soccer)
Joseph "Bull" Sintic, '33 (football)

1988
Bob Babbitt, '63 (football)
Roger Gilders, '80 (men's track and field)
Ken Kowall, '71 (men's basketball)
Rhonda Rawlins, '82 (women's field hockey, women's lacrosse)
Dick Smail, '56 (men's golf)
John Turk, '54 (baseball, football)

1989
Don Fish, '69 (men's track and field)
Kathryn MacDonald, '72 (women's basketball, field hockey, lacrosse, track and field))
Dave Tobik, '76 (baseball)
Lenny Sadosky, '33 (football, men's track and field)
Bill Whaley, '62 (men's basketball)

1990–1999
1990
Lowell "Duke" Anderson, '54 (baseball, football)
Elden Armbrust, '35 (football, men's track and field)
Mike Haley, '67 (men's basketball)
Ernie Kish, '42 (baseball)
Robert Tscholl, '73 (wrestling)
Kathy Williams (Thompson), '82 (women's track and field)

1991
Kevin Babcock, '80 (football)
John Canine, '70 (men's basketball)
Frances Daniell (Calcutt), '84 (women's track and field)
Dick England, '54 (baseball, baseball head coach)
Ron Fowlkes, '66 (football)
Caroline Mast (Daugherty), '86 (women's basketball)
Dave Unik, '69 (wrestling)

1992
Marti Heckman, '86 women's basketball
Bill Heller, '65 men's cross country
Bruce Hosta, '73 (wrestling)
Craig Love, '71 (men's basketball)
Dave Moore, '56 (men's golf)
Dick Schulz, '63 (football)
Diane Stamm, '79-'85 (women's track and field/cross country head coach)
Becky Walters (Rafferty), '82 women's field hockey

1993
Jim Albert, '66 (football)
John Hrasch, '51 (baseball)
Sherman Lyle, '73 men's soccer
Danny Nee, '80-'86 (men's basketball head coach)
Roger Pedigo, '53 (men's golf)
Franko Peters, '69 (football)
Robert Tatum, '86 (men's basketball)

1994
Henry Clark, '88 (swimming and diving)
Selina Christian Safari, '86 (women's track and field)
Mike Echstenkamper, '79 (baseball)
Dave Leveck, '70 (football)
Paul Storey, '64 (men's basketball)

1995
John Bier, '56 (baseball)
Anne Bolyard, '88 (women's basketball, women's track and field)
Gail Hudson Ruffins, '84 (women's basketball, women's field hockey, women's lacrosse)
Dave Jamerson, '90 (men's basketball)
Gus Malavite, '76 (wrestling)
Glenn Romanek, '54 (swimming and diving)
Ted Stute, '63 (baseball, football)

1996
Kurt Blank, '75 (wrestling)
Joy Clark, '91 (swimming and diving)
Roger Hosler, '68 (men's track and field)
Kevin Priessman, '84 (baseball)
Shannan Ritchie, '90 (men's cross country, men's track and field)

1997
Mark Geisler, '80 (football)
Jane Maher, '83 (women's field hockey, women's lacrosse)
Tracy Meyer, '89 (women's cross country, women's track and field)

1998
no inductees—induction moved from spring to fall

1999
Courtney Allen (Asher), '92 (swimming and diving)
Christine Eby (Axer), '88 (women's field hockey)
Chris Nichols (Allwine), '91 (women's cross country, women's track and field)
Darla Dutro, '82 (women's basketball, women's lacrosse)
Maureen Newlon (Blandford), '92 (swimming and diving)
Glenn C. Randall, '59 (men's track and field)

2000–2009
2000
Ronnie Harter, '84 (football)
Greg Jones, '91 (men's track and field)
Tim Joyce, '79 (men's basketball)
Steven D. Skaggs, '80 (men's basketball)
Mary Catherine Taylor, '86 (women's basketball, women's track and field)

2001
Marcy Keifer Kennedy, '94 (swimming and diving)
Eric Kimble, '95 (wrestling)
Holly Skeen-Gilbert, '95 (women's basketball)

2002
John Botuchis, '55 (swimming and diving)
Jeri Pantalone, '85 (women's field hockey)
Les Ream, '77 (baseball)
Ned Steele, '71 (swimming and diving)

2003
Vernon Alden, '62 (university president)
Orville Dwight Gardner, '98 (wrestling)
Scott Hammond, '89-'95 (swimming and diving head coach)
Nicholas "Nick" Karl, '64 (men's golf)
Lisa MacNicol (Mitchell), '97 (swimming and diving)

2004
Paul Baron, '86 (men's basketball)
Staci Bellville, '96 (softball)
Shawn Enright, '99 (wrestling)
David "Bucky" Wagner, ‘61 (football)

2005
Lewis Geter, '93 (men's basketball)
Joshua Ritchie, '98 (men's cross country, men's track and field)

2006
Bart Leahy, '98 (baseball)
Amy Lockard, '93 (swimming and diving)
Harold McElhaney, (athletics director)

2007
Dick Schorr, ’67-’98 (broadcaster)
Dave Zastudil, ’01 (football)
Joe Zychowicz, ’72 (wrestling)

2008
Jackie Conrad, '99 (women's cross country, women's track and field)
Geno Ford, ’97 (men's basketball)
Jen Morris, ’99 (softball)

2009
Ron Fenik, '59 (men's football)
Gwynn Gordon, '90 (women's swimming and diving)
Cathy Silvia, '91 (women's swimming and diving)
Bill Toadvine, '71 (men's baseball coach)

2010–2019
2010
Michael Arbinger, '02 (men's baseball)
Joe Carbone, '70 (men's baseball, men's baseball head coach)
Julie Cole, '75 (women's basketball, women's golf)
Jake Percival, '05 (men's wrestling)

2011
Emmett Taylor, (men's track and field)
Alexandra Johnstone, '01 (women's field hockey)
Robert Moock, '71 (men's golf)

2012
Hollie Bonewit-Cron, '00 (women's swimming and diving)
Richard Grecni, '60 (men's football)
Gary Trent, (men's basketball)
1960 Ohio Football Team, (men's football)

2013
Laura Cobb, '04 (women's volleyball)
Joe Nossek, '61 (men's baseball)
Bryan Oswald, '98 (men's wrestling)

2014
Anthony Gressick, '08 (men's baseball)
Scott Mayle, '07 (men's football, men's track and field)
Kim van Selm, '02 (women's swimming and diving)
Mike Schuler, '62 (men's basketball)

2015
Briana Adamovsky, '04 (women's volleyball)
Dion Byrum, '06 (men's football)
Joanne Park, '00 (women's swimming and diving)
Bob Willet, '66 (men's baseball)

2016
Ellen Herman, '09 (women's volleyball)
Samuel Shon, '81 (men's football)
Tim Courtad, '00 (men's wrestling)
Criss Somerlot, '69 (Lifetime Achievement)

2017
Ben Crabtree, '06 (men's baseball)
Lauren Mazziotto, '02 (women's field hockey)
Kalvin McRae, '11 (men's football)
Charles "Skip" Vosler, (athletic trainer; Lifetime Achievement)

2018
Melissa Griffin, '08 (women's volleyball)
Tiffany Horvath, '07 (women's soccer)
Marc Krauss, '17 (men's baseball)
1968 Football Team, (men's football)

2019
Larry Hunter, '71 & '73 (men's basketball head coach; Lifetime Achievement)
Ryan Kyes, '01 (men's baseball)
Tyler Tettleton, '13 (men's football)
Julia Winfield, '06 (women's volleyball)

2020–present
2020
Geoff Carlston, (women's volleyball head coach)
Jennifer Scholl, '93 (Swimming and Diving) 
1970 baseball team (men's baseball)
2021
2022
Brandon Hunter (Men's Basketball 1999-2003)
Kelly Lamberti (Volleyball, 2011-14)
Andy Smiles (Soccer, 1970-73)
Frank Solich (Football coach, 2005-20)
1964 Men's Cross Country Team

References

Further reading

External links

Ohio Bobcats
Ohio
Awards established in 1965
Halls of fame in Ohio
1965 establishments in Ohio